Dindica wilemani is a moth of the family Geometridae first described by Louis Beethoven Prout in 1927. It is found in Taiwan.

References

Pseudoterpnini
Taxa named by Louis Beethoven Prout
Moths described in 1927